Mala Mala may refer to:

Mala Mala Airport, airport at Mala Mala, South Africa
Mala Mala Game Reserve, a game reserve located within the Sabi Sand Game Reserve, Mpumalanga province, South Africa
Mala Mala (film), 2014 Puerto Rican documentary film